Below is an episodic synopsis of Double Bonus, which consists of 23 episodes and broadcast on MediaCorp Channel 8.

Episodic Synopsis

See also
List of programmes broadcast by Mediacorp Channel 8
Double Bonus

Lists of Singaporean television series episodes
Lists of fantasy television series episodes